Hlásná Třebaň is a municipality and village in Beroun District in the Central Bohemian Region of the Czech Republic. It has about 1,200 inhabitants.

Administrative parts
The village of Rovina is an administrative part of Hlásná Třebaň.

Geography
It lies in the Hořovice Uplands. The municipality in situated on the left bank of the Berounka River. Most of the municipal territory lies within the Bohemian Karst Protected Landscape Area.

History
The first written mention of Přední Třebaň is from 1000, when Duke Boleslaus III donated the village to the newly established Ostrov Monastery in Davle. King Charles IV bought the village in 1357 and joined it to the Karlštejn estate. Přední Třebaň was renamed Hlásná Třebaň due to the obligation of the men in the village to carry out guarding service (hlásná služba) at Karlštejn Castle.

The village of Rovina was established between 1784 and 1808.

Sights
In the centre of Hlásná Třebaň is a late Baroque chapel from 1867.

References

External links

Villages in the Beroun District